Alberto Tognoli (born 26 July 1937, Brescia, died 3 March 2008 in Rapallo) was an Italian mathematician, who worked on algebraic geometry.

Tognoli received his Ph.D. (Laurea) in 1960 from the University of Pisa. From 1970 he became full professor at the same university, and he also taught in Cosenza, Ferrara, Paris and Tours. He was also a professor of geometry at the University of Trento from 1986 until his retirement as professor emeritus in 2005.

He is known for his research on Nash functions and Nash manifolds (named after John Nash). He proved Nash's conjecture that smooth compact manifolds are diffeomorphic to non-singular real algebraic manifolds (known as the Theorem of Nash and Tognoli).

He received in 1974 the Caccioppoli Prize and in 1988 the Gold Medal in Mathematics of the Accademia dei XL.

Selected publications

Algebraic Geometry and Nash Functions, Institutiones Mathematicae, Academic Press 1978
as editor with M. Galbiati: Real analytic and algebraic geometry : proceedings of the conference held in Trento, Italy, October 3–7, 1988, Lecture Notes in Mathematics 1420, Springer Verlag 1990
Singularities of Analytic Spaces, CIME, Rom: Cremonese 1975
Introduzione alla teoria degli spazi analitici reali, Rom, Accademia dei Lincei 1976
Approximation theorems and Nash conjecture, Memoires SMF, 38, 1974, 53-68, numdam
Algebraic approximation of manifolds and spaces, Seminaire Bourbaki, No. 548, 1979/80, numdam

with Alessandro Tancredi:

References

External links
Produ
 zione Scientifica – Alberto Tognoli

1937 births
2008 deaths
Italian mathematicians
University of Pisa alumni
Academic staff of the University of Trento